Konstantinos Negris (1804 - 1880) was an author, mathematician, physicist, and professor.  He fought in the Greek War of Independence.  Konstantinos was a member of the prominent Phanariots family Negris.  He was one of the first professors at the newly founded University of Athens and introduced the works of Legendre and Hachette to Greek education, also he was one of the first professors to study abroad; consequently, Greek students continued their studies in France and Germany.  He personally intervened in the education of Greek mathematician Ioannis Papadakis.  Both Papadakis and Negris influenced the educational path of Nikolaos Ch. Nikolaidis and Cyparissos Stephanos.  Konstantino's sons were Theodoros Negris and Fokion Negris.

Biography 
Konstantinos was born in Constantinople around 1804. His father was Ioannis Negris and his mother was Katerina Manou.  The family was originally from Constantinople.  They played a major part in Greece's independence.  They were Phanariots.  He married Smaragda Spiropoulou. Fokion was a mineralogist and Minister of Finance.  His second son Theodoros became a prominent mathematician.  Konstantinos completed his basic education in Chios.  He studied with Neophytos Vambas.  During the onset of the Greek revolution, the young seventeen-year-old Konstantinos traveled to Greece with his family and participated in the Greek War of Independence.  He fought in many battles.  He was captured by the Ottoman Turks.  Luckily, he was released in Constantinople due to his high-ranking status.  Alexandros Mavrokordatos insisted on the continuation of his education.  He sent him to finish high school and higher education in Paris, France.  Konstantinos attended the prestigious French university known as the École Polytechnique.  He studied mathematics and physics.  Greek physicist Dimitrios Stroumpos also attended the school around the same period.  Konstantinos was exposed to the works of Gaspard Monge, Adrien-Marie Legendre, and Jean Nicolas Pierre Hachette.     

Konstantino’s first cousin Alexander Negris traveled to the United States.  He taught at Harvard. He was the first lecturer of Modern Greek at Harvard University in 1828.  He also published the first-ever grammar of the modern Greek language in the United States. Konstantinos returned to Greece during the mid-1830s. He became one of the first professors at the University of Athens.  He taught physics and mathematics.  In his autographed letter to the Secretary of Education on July 21, 1836, he proposed to teach descriptive geometry.  He used five books written by Legendre. Legendre's Elements of geometry, Legendre's rectilinear trigonometry, the general properties of numbers, algebra, and Hachette's descriptive geometry.  He also taught differential and integral calculus.  His lectures on descriptive geometry focused on the intersections of second-degree surfaces and three-dimensional analytic geometry. He taught binomial theorem.  The applied mathematics taught in early Greek education was used for civil engineering, astronomy, mechanics, architecture, fortification, and navigation.   He helped Greek mathematician Ioannis Papadakis study abroad.  There was extensive political uncertainty in the newly established monarchy.        

In the year 1843, in the month of September, the people were unsatisfied with the foreign monarch chosen to lead the new nation.  They led an insurrection called the The Revolution of September 3, 1843.  The people obtained a constitutional monarchy. Every foreign professor was expelled from the university in favor of Greek professors.  Konstantinos, Xaver Landerer, Karl Nikolas Fraas, Friedrich Zentner, Charles Laurent, Christian Hansen, and Theophil Hansen were all expelled.  Within one year most of the faculty were rehired.  Konstantinos was rehired within several months.  He stopped teaching in 1845 and continued to assist the newly founded Greek state diplomatically.  He traveled all over the world.
By 1848, Konstantinos participated in the debate regarding the Greek monetary crisis.  He actively worked to reduce the homeless problem in Athens.  During the 1860s the bourgeoisie of Athens including Konstantinos created The Merciful Company of Athens (Ελεήμονα Εταιρεία Αθηνών).  He was the vice president.  He participated in the Greek elections of 1869 on an independent platform.  He was opposed to the universal suffrage movement of the 1860s.  He supported moderate modernization.

References

Bibliography

Greek people of the Greek War of Independence
1804 births
1880 deaths
19th-century Greek educators
19th-century Greek scientists
Academic staff of the National and Kapodistrian University of Athens
19th-century Greek physicists
19th-century Greek mathematicians
Phanariotes
Constantinopolitan Greeks
Academics from Istanbul
Writers from Istanbul
Scientists from Istanbul
Military personnel from Istanbul